Carrier Dove was the name of several ships:

 , an 1855 California clipper ship
Carrier Dove, an 1854 schooner that sunk in Lake Ontario
Carrier Dove (1857 schooner), built in Wilmington, North Carolina
Carrier Dove (1884 schooner), built in Essex, Massachusetts
 , an 1890 four-masted lumber and fishing schooner built by the Hall Brothers
Carrier Dove (1869 barque) built in Saint John, New Brunswick

Carrier Dove